The Giardini Botanici dell'Isola Madre (8 hectares) are historic botanical gardens located on the grounds of Isola Madre in the Borromean Islands of Lake Maggiore, accessible by ferry from Stresa, Province of Verbano-Cusio-Ossola, Piedmont, Italy. They are open daily in the warmer months; an admission fee is charged.

The gardens extend in seven terraces across the small island of Isola Madre, originally inhabited by Count Lancillotto Borromeo in the early sixteenth century. They were designed for Count Vitaliano Borromeo all’Inglese (in the English style) in the late eighteenth century on the site of a citrus orchard, and have remained essentially unchanged since. Among their many visitors have been Napoleon Bonaparte, Gustave Flaubert, and Théophile Gautier. Principal gardens are as follows:

 Loggia del Cashmir - cypress trees
 Piano delle Camelie - One of the earliest camellia collections in Italy.
 Piazzale dei Pappagalli - parrots, peacocks, pheasants, etc.
 Piazzale della Cappella - family chapel, constructed 1858
 Piazzale della Darsena - rhododendron forest
 Prato dei Ginerium - Pampas Grass
 Prato del Pozzo - cornus, magnolia, maple, etc.
 Viale Africa - the island's sunny side.
 Viale delle Palme - a notable palm collection, with specimens up to 125 years old

See also 
 List of botanical gardens in Italy

References 
 Giardini Botanici dell'Isola Madre
 Visitors' information (Italian)
 Agriturando description (Italian)
 Horti entry
 "Borromean Islands", Encyclopædia Britannica, 1824, page 371.
 Guiseppi Mannetti, "Notice of the Plants which grown in the open Air in the Borromean Islands (Isola Bella and Isola Madre) in the Lago Maggiore", The Gardener's Magazine and Register of Rural and Domestic Improvement, J C Loudon (ed.), Longman, Rees, Orome, Brown and Green, March 1840, pages 241–243.
 Théophile Gautier, "Lago Maggiore", The Works of Théophile Gautier, vol. 7 (Travels in Italy), trans. F. C. de Sumichrast, The Jenson society, 1901, page 16.
 Ann Laras, "Isola Madre", Gardens of Italy, Frances Lincoln Ltd, 2005, page 181. .

Botanical gardens in Italy
Stresa
Gardens in Piedmont
Lake Maggiore